Kim Jin-Sol  (born 11 January 1989) is a South Korean footballer who plays for Cheonan City FC as a forward.

He last played for Daejeon Citizen in the K-League.

External links 

1989 births
Living people
Association football forwards
South Korean footballers
Daejeon Hana Citizen FC players
K League 1 players
Korea National League players
People from Gimhae
Sportspeople from South Gyeongsang Province